Manuel Herrera López (born 21 November 1991), known as Súper, is a Spanish professional footballer who plays as a defender for Singapore Premier League club Lion City Sailors.

He started his career in the youth and reserve teams of Real Betis and later played for clubs in the Segunda División B. He then played for Filipino club Ceres–Negros where he won three consecutive league titles.

Club career
Born in Seville, Andalusia, Súper graduated from the youth academy of Real Betis, and reached the reserves midway through the 2010–11 season. He made his debut in Segunda División B on 2 January 2011, coming on as a second-half substitute in a 2–2 home draw against Lucena CF.

On 9 March 2012, Súper was called to the first team by manager Pepe Mel for a La Liga match against Real Madrid, but he remained on the bench in the 2–3 home loss the following day. After leaving the Estadio Benito Villamarín he continued to compete in the third level, representing in quick succession Elche CF Ilicitano, FC Cartagena, CD San Roque de Lepe and CF Villanovense.

Súper signed with Tercera División club Caudal Deportivo in the last minutes of the 2016 winter transfer window. He appeared in 16 matches across all competitions in his debut campaign (including the play-offs), helping to promotion. On 10 December, he was released.

On 31 December 2016, Súper moved abroad for the first time as he joined Ceres-Negros of the Philippines Football League (PFL). He was recruited by the club's coach, Risto Vidaković, who was his former coach at Betis B. Súper headed the consolation goal in their 2–1 PFL defeat by Meralco Manila on 16 August 2017. Ceres ended the season as winners of  the PFL's inaugural title. He also played in the 2017 AFC Cup. In the 2018 AFC Cup group match against Home United, he headed the equalising goal from Manny Ott's corner kick, forcing a 1–1 draw. In the first leg of the ASEAN zonal semifinal, he contributed a goal in their 4–2 win over Yangon United. In the 2018 PFL, Ceres successfully defended their title. Súper was part of the squad that won the 2019 domestic double without a single defeat. He scored the first goal in their 3–0 win over Philippine Air Force on 17 August. He last played for Ceres in the 2020 AFC Cup as tournaments were suspended or cancelled due to the COVID-19 pandemic. The financial impact of the pandemic forced the club to terminate its players' contracts. After a change in ownership, majority of the Ceres players re-signed but Súper did not.

In September 2020, he returned to Spain and joined UD Lanzarote of the Tercera División's Group 12 (Canary Islands).

In 2021, he signed for Nagaworld of the Cambodian League.

Career statistics

Honours
Ceres–Negros
Philippines Football League: 2017, 2018, 2019
Copa Paulino Alcantara: 2019

References

External links

1991 births
Living people
Footballers from Seville
Spanish footballers
Association football defenders
Segunda División B players
Tercera División players
Betis Deportivo Balompié footballers
Elche CF Ilicitano footballers
FC Cartagena footballers
CD San Roque de Lepe footballers
CF Villanovense players
Caudal Deportivo footballers
Ceres–Negros F.C. players
Spanish expatriate footballers
Expatriate footballers in the Philippines
Expatriate footballers in Cambodia
Spanish expatriate sportspeople in the Philippines
Spanish expatriate sportspeople in Cambodia